Baby Bonnie Hood (B.B. Hood for short;   in Japan) is a fictional character in Capcom's Darkstalkers series. Modeled after Little Red Riding Hood, she is the only non-magical playable character in the series, and has been positively received by critics for her design and characterization.

Appearances

Darkstalkers series
Baby Bonnie Hood makes her debut in Darkstalkers 3 as a monster bounty hunter who hails from Northern Europe. As a Darkhunter, she kills Darkstalkers for money, and employs modern weaponry such as an Uzi submachine gun (sometimes substituted by a MAC-10), land mines, knives, and apple-shaped grenades—an arsenal she carries inside her picnic basket that itself doubles as a rocket launcher—all in her missions of hunting down creatures that have encroached onto Earth from the otherworldly dimension of Makai. Though she fights evil as a Darkhunter like Donovan and Hsien-Ko, she is an evil psychopath motivated mainly by profit, and her own heart was dark enough that Jedah Dohma, the game's reality bending antagonist, considered her a Darkstalker and therefore transported her into Majigen, a magical realm he has created within Makai expressly for imprisoning souls he deemed valuable.

Design and gameplay
B.B. Hood's character design and name are a play on Little Red Riding Hood, with her violent personality serving as an ironic contrast to the innocent naïvete of her appearance and namesake. Character designer Akira Yasuda (Akiman) stated that while the other Darkstalkers characters were inspired by an archetype of either mythology, folklore or popular culture, B.B. Hood was instead inspired by the sinister qualities of the human race itself, thus serving as a personification of humanity's dark side. During development of Darkstalkers 3, after B.B. Hood's design was finalized, the team could not figure out how the character should move in-game, so Akiman drew sketches of her moves and poses and pitched them to the graphic department. 

B.B. Hood  is the only fully human playable character in the Darkstalkers series. She carries her picnic basket on her arm during gameplay and has a small dog named Harry that watches the action from the sidelines and reacts in fear whenever she takes damage or fires a gun. Two rifle-wielding huntsmen named John and Arthur briefly appear alongside her in a special power-up move titled "Beautiful Hunting" that inflicts extra damage on opponents, and her victory poses range from her singing into a microphone to a man called Mr. K. counting money into her hand.

Other games
Like many of the Darkstalkers characters, B.B. Hood has appeared in numerous Capcom crossover titles. She is a hidden character along with Mega Man in the shooter Cannon Spike and is selectable in SNK vs. Capcom: The Match of the Millennium and Marvel vs. Capcom 2: New Age of Heroes. The character additionally appears in Onimusha Soul, in collectible-card style titles SVC: Card Fighters 2 Expand Edition and SNK vs. Capcom: Card Fighters DS, as well as in the tactical role-playing game Project X Zone 2 as an enemy unit.

B.B. Hood makes unplayable cameos in the "Underworld" stage and in Darkstalkers boss character Pyron's ending in Capcom Fighting Evolution, on Dhalsim's "Toy Shop" stage in Pocket Fighter, in mobile game Street Fighter × All Capcom, and on a wanted poster in Ultimate Marvel vs. Capcom 3. Dead Rising character Frank West can be dressed up as B.B. Hood in downloadable content for the 2013 survival-horror beat 'em up Dead Rising 3.

Merchandise and promotion
B.B. Hood is a featured character in the third and fourth chapters of the 1997 five-volume manga Vampire Savior: Tamashii no Mayoigo by Mayumi Azuma, in which she is called Baretta (the romanization of her Japanese name) and relentlessly pursues Gallon (Jon Talbain). She then cons her way into Majigen, as opposed to being invited per the game's storyline, by falsely claiming to be among Jedah's chosen souls in hopes of going after the Darkstalkers therein and securing a massive payday. B.B. Hood featured little in the 2004 Darkstalkers comic series by Udon Entertainment, making her largest appearance in a five-page sidestory titled "The Silver Necklace" in issue six, which additionally featured her on the alternate cover. 

Capcom released a B.B. Hood figure in a two-pack with Talbain as part of their "Video Game Super Star" series released in the West in 1999, while other figures and merchandise of the character were available only in Japan. Enormous character stands of B.B. Hood and Lilith promoted Darkstalkers 3 at the Japanese arcade trade show AOU '97.

Reception
Since her debut in Darkstalkers 3, B.B. Hood has been well received. She was named the best arcade game character of 1997 by Japanese magazine Gamest. Patrick Roesle of Hardcore Gaming 101 praised her originality, calling her the "best idea for a fighting game character". Complex ranked her 22nd in their 2012 list of the fifty most dominant fighting game characters, B.B. Hood finished fourth behind series mainstays Morrigan, Felicia and Demitri in a fan-voted Darkstalkers favorite-character poll hosted by GameFAQs in 2002. 

In 1998, Sega Saturn Magazine praised her as an original, cool character. Den of Geek deemed her "the true star" of Darkstalkers 3 in a 2015 retrospective on the series. They praised her design and enjoyability to play as well as being "the monster that is man" in contrast with the literal monsters in the game. Michał R. Wiśniewski from Wirtualna Polska noted B.B. Hood as a visually unique player character in Darkstalkers fitting neither the series' typical horrific or sexy labels. The character of Cisqua from Mayumi Azuma's manga series Elemental Gelade was partially modeled after B.B. Hood. Long Gone Days designer Camila Gormaz praised B.B. Hood's idle animation when crouching as one of her favorites, where butterflies would fly around her and a flower would eventually sprout.

See also
Stryker (Mortal Kombat)
List of Darkstalkers characters

References

Characters designed by Akira Yasuda
Child characters in video games
Darkstalkers characters
Capcom antagonists
Female characters in anime and manga
Female characters in video games
Fictional bounty hunters
Fictional gunfighters in video games
Fictional monster hunters
Fictional characters with neurological or psychological disorders
Fictional hunters in video games
Video game characters introduced in 1997
Woman soldier and warrior characters in video games
Works based on Little Red Riding Hood